Arturo Torres Carrasco (20 October 1906 – 20 April 1987) was a Chilean football midfielder. He was part of Chile's team at the 1928 Summer Olympics.

References

External links

Arturo Torres at PartidosdeLaRoja.com  

1906 births
1987 deaths
People from Coronel
Chilean footballers
Chile international footballers
Olympic footballers of Chile
Footballers at the 1928 Summer Olympics
1930 FIFA World Cup players
Colo-Colo footballers
Everton de Viña del Mar footballers
Deportes Magallanes footballers
Audax Italiano footballers
Magallanes footballers
Chilean Primera División players
Association football midfielders
Chilean football managers
Magallanes managers
Chilean Primera División managers